The 2018–19 Dominica Premier League is the 54th season of the Dominica Premier League, the top division football competition in Dominica. The season began on 18 August 2018.

League table

References

External links
Dominica Football Association
Dominica Football Association Facebook page

Dominica Premiere League seasons
Dominica
1